Mongolia  is a landlocked country in Central Asia and East Asia, located between China and Russia. The terrain is one of mountains and rolling plateaus, with a high degree of relief. The total land area of Mongolia is 1,564,116 square kilometres. Overall, the land slopes from the high Altai Mountains of the west and the north to plains and depressions in the east and the south. The Khüiten Peak in extreme western Mongolia on the Chinese border is the highest point.

The landscape includes one of Asia's largest freshwater lakes (Lake Khövsgöl), many salt lakes, marshes, sand dunes, rolling grasslands, alpine forests, and permanent mountain glaciers. Northern and western Mongolia are seismically active zones, with frequent earthquakes and many hot springs and extinct volcanoes.

Mountain regions 

Mongolia has four major mountain ranges. The highest is the Altai Mountains, which stretch across the western and the southwestern regions of the country on a northwest-to-southeast axis.

The Khangai Mountains, mountains also trending northwest to southeast, occupy much of central and north-central Mongolia. These are older, lower, and more eroded mountains, with many forests and alpine pastures.

The northern parts are covered in taiga, while the southern parts are filled with dry steppe. The range forms the watershed between the Arctic Ocean (via Lake Baikal) and the Pacific Ocean basins. Rivers originating in the range include the Onon, Kherlen, Menza and Tuul. These mountains also house the capital of Ulaanbaatar.

The Khövsgöl Mountains occupy the north of the country. It trends from north to south and generally has a lot of steep peaks. Young mountain range with Alpine characteristics, high gradient, with narrow cliffs.

Much of eastern Mongolia is occupied by a plain, and the lowest area is a southwest-to-northeast trending depression that reaches from the Gobi Desert region in the south to the eastern frontier.

Rivers and lakes 

Some of Mongolia's waterways drain to the oceans, but many finish at Endorheic basins in the deserts and the depressions of Inner Asia. Rivers are most extensively developed in the north, and the country's major river system is that of the Selenge, which drains via Lake Baikal to the Arctic Ocean. Some minor tributaries of Siberia's Yenisei River, which also flows to the Arctic Ocean, rise in the mountains of northwestern Mongolia. In northeastern Mongolia the Onon River drains into the Pacific Ocean through the Shilka River in Russia and the Amur (Heilong Jiang) rivers, forming the tenth longest river system in the world.

Many rivers of western Mongolia end at lakes in the Central Asian Internal Drainage Basin, most often in the Great Lakes Depression, or at Hulun Lake, Ulaan Lake or Ulungur Lake. The few streams of southern Mongolia do not reach the sea but run into lakes or deserts.

Mongolia's largest lake by area, Uvs Lake is in the Great Lakes Depression. Mongolia's largest lake by volume of water, Lake Khövsgöl, drains via the Selenge river to the Arctic Ocean. One of the most easterly lakes of Mongolia, Hoh Nuur, at an elevation of 557 metres, is the lowest point in the country. In total, the lakes and rivers of Mongolia cover 10,560 square kilometres, or 0.67% of the country.

Climate

Overview 

Mongolia has a high elevation, with a cold and dry climate. It has an extreme continental climate with long, cold winters and short summers, during which most precipitation falls. The country averages 257 cloudless days a year, and it is usually at the center of a region of high atmospheric pressure. The extreme south is the Gobi Desert, some regions of which receive no precipitation at all in most years. The name Gobi is a Mongol word meaning desert, depression, salt marsh, or steppe, but which usually refers to a category of arid rangeland with insufficient vegetation to support marmots but with enough to support camels. Mongols distinguish Gobi from desert proper, although the distinction is not always apparent to outsiders unfamiliar with the Mongolian landscape. Gobi rangelands are fragile and are easily destroyed by overgrazing, which results in expansion of the true desert, a stony waste where not even Bactrian camels can survive.

Average temperatures over most of the country are below freezing from November through March and are above freezing in April and October. Most of Mongolia is covered by discontinuous permafrost (grading to continuous at high altitudes), which makes construction, road building, and mining difficult. All rivers and freshwater lakes freeze over in the winter, and smaller streams commonly freeze to the bottom.

Mongolia's weather is characterized by extreme variability and short-term unpredictability in the summer, and the multiyear averages conceal wide variations in precipitation, dates of frosts, and occurrences of blizzards and spring dust storms. Such weather poses severe challenges to human and livestock survival. Official statistics list less than 1% of the country as arable, 8 to 10% as forest, and the rest as pasture or desert. Grain, mostly wheat, is grown in the valleys of the Selenge river system in the north, but yields fluctuate widely and unpredictably as a result of the amount and the timing of rain and the dates of killing frosts.

Zud 

Although winters are generally cold and clear, and livestock can survive, under various weather conditions livestock are unable to graze and die in large numbers. A winter in which this occurs is known as a zud; causes include blizzards, drought, extreme cold, and freezing rain. Such losses of livestock, which are an inevitable and, in a sense, normal consequence of the climate, have made it difficult for planned increases in livestock numbers to be achieved.

Seasonal blizzards 

Severe blizzards can occur in the region. The winters of 1970–1971, 2000–2001, 2008–2009 and 2009–2010 were particularly harsh, featuring extremely severe zuds.

The blizzards of December 2011 blocked many roads, and killed 16,000 livestock and 10 people. The Mongolian State Emergency Commission said it was the coldest winter in thirty years and, like the preceding harsh summer drought, could have been the result of global warming. The United Nations provided major aid due to the high level of damage caused.

In the snowstorms between the 8 and 28 May 2008, 21 people were killed and 100 others went missing in seven provinces in eastern Mongolia. The toll finally reached at least 52 people and 200,000 livestock by the end of June. Most of the victims were herders who froze to death along with their livestock. It was the worst cold snap since the founding of the modern state in 1922.

Snowstorms in December 2009 – February 2010 also killed 8,000,000 livestock and 60 people.

Climate change

Ecoregions 

 Altai montane forest and forest steppe
 Khangai Mountains conifer forests
 Selenge-Orkhon forest steppe
 Sayan montane conifer forests
 Trans-Baikal conifer forests
 Daurian forest steppe
 Mongolian-Manchurian grassland
 Altai alpine meadow and tundra
 Khangai Mountains alpine meadow
 Sayan alpine meadows and tundra
 Alashan Plateau semi-desert
 Eastern Gobi desert steppe
 Gobi desert
 Gobi Lakes Valley desert steppe
 Great Lakes Basin desert steppe
 Junggar Basin semi-desert

Resources and land use 

Land use:
arable land:
9.10%
permanent crops:
0%
other:
99.61% (2011)

Irrigated land:
843 km² (2011)

Total renewable water resources:
34.8 km 3 (2011)

See also 
 Greater Mongolia
 Mongolian Plateau
 List of reptiles of Mongolia

References

External links 
  Administration of Land Affairs, Geodesy and Cartography
  Official government site – Institute of Meteorology and Hydrology
  Official government site – Mineral Resources Authority
  Official government site – Water Agency of Mongolia
 Limnological Catalogue of Mongolian Lakes
 GEOLOGY OF THE KHARKHIRAA UUL, MONGOLIAN ALTAI

 

bn:মঙ্গোলিয়া#ভূগোল